Ventridens is a genus of air-breathing land snails, terrestrial pulmonate gastropod mollusks in the family Gastrodontidae.

Species
Species in the genus Ventridens include:
Ventridens acerra – glossy dome
Ventridens arcellus – golden dome
Ventridens brittsi – western dome
Ventridens cerinoideus – wax dome
Ventridens coelaxis – bidentate dome
Ventridens collisella – sculptured dome
Ventridens decussatus – crossed dome
Ventridens demissus – perforate dome
Ventridens eutropis – carinate dome
Ventridens gularis – throaty dome
Ventridens intertextus – pyramid dome
Ventridens lasmodon – hollow dome
Ventridens lawae – rounded dome
Ventridens ligera – globose dome
Ventridens monodon – blade dome
Ventridens percallosus – Tennessee dome
Ventridens pilsbryi – yellow dome
Ventridens suppressus – flat dome
Ventridens theloides – copper dome
Ventridens virginicus – split-tooth dome
Ventridens volusiae – Seminole dome

See also

Studies
 C. M. Sinclair-Winters, Journal of Molluscan Studies, 2014. Upstream or downstream? Population structure of the land snail Ventridens ligera (Say, 1821) in the Potomac River drainage basin. 80, 280 - 285

References

Zonitidae
Gastropod genera